Marlboro Village is an unincorporated community and census-designated place (CDP) in Prince George's County, Maryland, United States. 
Per the 2020 census, the population was 9,221. It was newly delineated for the 2010 census prior to which the area was part of the Greater Upper Marlboro census-designated place.

Geography

Demographics

2020 census

Note: the US Census treats Hispanic/Latino as an ethnic category. This table excludes Latinos from the racial categories and assigns them to a separate category. Hispanics/Latinos can be of any race.

Government and infrastructure
Marlboro Village houses the Prince George's County Correctional Center.

Education
Prince George's County Public Schools operates public schools serving the census-designated place. Barack Obama and Perrywood elementary schools serve sections of the CDP. James Madison and Kettering middle schools serve sections of the CDP. The zoned high school is Dr. Henry A Wise, Jr. High School.

References

Census-designated places in Maryland
Census-designated places in Prince George's County, Maryland